The Fay Hyland Botanical Plantation (also known as the Fay Hyland Arboretum), 10 acres (40,000 m2), is an arboretum and botanical garden located along the Stillwater River on the University of Maine campus in Orono, Maine, United States. It is open to the public daily.

The Arboretum was established in 1934, named in honor of Fay Hyland, and contains living examples of woody plants from Maine and throughout the world.

See also 
 List of botanical gardens in the United States

External links
 University of Maine: Fay Hyland Arboretum

Botanical gardens in Maine
Protected areas affiliated with the University of Maine
Tourist attractions in Penobscot County, Maine
Protected areas established in 1934
1934 establishments in Maine